Marcelo Fabián Cascabelo Ferreyra  (born 6 February 1964) is a retired Argentine long-distance runner who competed primarily in the 3000 metres steeplechase. He represented his country at the 1992 Summer Olympics without advancing from the first round. He also competed at one outdoor and one indoor World Championships. He won the Konex Award from Argentina in 1990.

International competitions

Personal bests

Outdoor
3000 metres – 8:30.61 (Granada 1989)
5000 metres – 13:40.70 (A Coruña 1989)
10,000 metres – 28:28.22 (Maia 1992)
2000 metres steeplechase – 5:25.69 (Verona 1992) NR
3000 metres steeplechase – 8:25.63 (Belgrade 1989) NR
Indoor
3000 metres – 8:14.97 (Barcelona 1995)

References

1964 births
Living people
Argentine male long-distance runners
Argentine male steeplechase runners
Olympic male steeplechase runners
Olympic athletes of Argentina
Athletes (track and field) at the 1992 Summer Olympics
Pan American Games competitors for Argentina
Athletes (track and field) at the 1987 Pan American Games
Athletes (track and field) at the 1991 Pan American Games
Athletes (track and field) at the 1995 Pan American Games
South American Games silver medalists for Argentina
South American Games medalists in athletics
Competitors at the 1986 South American Games
Competitors at the 1994 Goodwill Games
World Athletics Championships athletes for Argentina
Japan Championships in Athletics winners
20th-century Argentine people